A mixed Poisson distribution is a univariate discrete probability distribution in stochastics. It results from assuming that the conditional distribution of a random variable, given the value of the rate parameter, is a Poisson distribution, and that the rate parameter itself is considered as a random variable. Hence it is a special case of a compound probability distribution. Mixed Poisson distributions can be found in actuarial mathematics as a general approach for the distribution of the number of claims and is also examined as an epidemiological model. It should not be confused with compound Poisson distribution or compound Poisson process.

Definition 
A random variable X satisfies the mixed Poisson distribution with density (λ) if it has the probability distribution

 

If we denote the probabilities of the Poisson distribution by qλ(k), then

Properties 

 The variance is always bigger than the expected value. This property is called overdispersion. This is in contrast to the Poisson distribution where mean and variance are the same.
 In practice, almost only densities of gamma distributions, logarithmic normal distributions and inverse Gaussian distributions are used as densities (λ). If we choose the density of the gamma distribution, we get the negative binomial distribution, which explains why this is also called the Poisson gamma distribution.

In the following let  be the expected value of the density  and  be the variance of the density.

Expected value 
The expected value of the mixed Poisson distribution is

Variance 
For the variance one gets

Skewness 
The skewness can be represented as

Characteristic function 
The characteristic function has the form

 

Where  is the moment generating function of the density.

Probability generating function 
For the probability generating function, one obtains

Moment-generating function 
The moment-generating function of the mixed Poisson distribution is

Examples

Table of mixed Poisson distributions

Literature 

 Jan Grandell: Mixed Poisson Processes. Chapman & Hall, London 1997, ISBN 0-412-78700-8 .
 Tom Britton: Stochastic Epidemic Models with Inference. Springer, 2019,

References 

Discrete distributions
 
Types of probability distributions